The collateral ligaments of interphalangeal joints are ligaments of the interphalangeal joints of the hand.

Ligaments of the upper limb